The Isaba tribe of the Ijaw people lives in and around the town of Isaba, south of Warri, Delta State, Nigeria. Some consider the Isaba to be their tribe; others consider it to be a part of the Ogbe tribe. This disagreement arises out of the decentralized authority structure of the Ogbe.

References

Ijaw
Delta State